The Direct Horizontal Drilling Fall Classic was an annual bonspiel, or curling tournament, that took place at the Crestwood Curling Club in Edmonton, Alberta. The tournament was held in a triple knockout format. The tournament started in 2013 as part of the World Curling Tour and was last held in 2017.

Past champions

References

External links
Crestwood Curling Club website

Former World Curling Tour events
Sport in Edmonton
Curling in Alberta